The following is an episode list of the BBC, ITV and Channel 5 television series Challenge Anneka together with their related challenges. In all there have, so far, been 70 episodes; the first 64 of which were broadcast on BBC One, 2 were broadcast on ITV1 and 4 on Channel 5. Episode names given are not official and are shown for reference only.

Pilot (1987)

Series 1 (1989)

Series 2 (1990–1)

Series 3 (1991)

Specials (1992)

Series 4 (1992)

Special (1993)

Series 5 (1993)

Series 6 (1994)

Series 7 (1995)

ITV Specials (2006–7)

Series 8 (2023)

References

Lists of British non-fiction television series episodes